3 familias  (stylized onscreen 3 familias, todos estamos bien), is a Mexican telenovela produced by Joshua Mintz and Ana Celia Urquidi for TV Azteca. It is an adaptation for Mexico of the Ecuadorian series of the same name. It premiered on October 23, 2017 and ended on May 25, 2018.  It stars Íngrid Martz as the titular character. The production of the telenovela officially began on September 11, 2017.

Plot 
Despite their abysmal differences, the Del Pedregal Barroso, the Mejorada Lezama and Barrio Bravo are three happy marriages, they love each other, they respect each other, they have everything; less the house of your dreams, since like many of the Mexicans: they yearn to have the ideal and own house. Bela Barroso (Ingrid Martz), after widowing, will have to face her new condition: "new poor", is waiting for a miracle that solves such a shameful situation and will remarry Gonzalo Adolfo Del Pedregal, a businessman newly arrived in the city and hiding a dark secret. While, at Marisa's insistence, Goyo Enhanced is more indebted than ever and on the brink of collapse.

And finally, after giving a brief life of the rich, Chabela and Chacho Bravo must return "close" to the house of the mother-in-law. Chayanne and Fer, sons of Chacho and Gonzalo Adolfo, respectively, who despite their differences, will star in an intense love story, impossible, of course, so they will try to separate them at all costs, generating a fun war between these families.

Cast 
 Íngrid Martz as Bela Barroso
 Carlos Espejel as Chacho Barrio
 Sylvia Pasquel as Frida Bravo
 Alma Cero as Chabela Bravo
 Luis Curiel as Chayanne Barrio Chico
 Rodrigo Mejía as Gonzalo Adolfo del Pedregal
 Renata Manterola as Fer del Pedregal
 Alejandra Toussaint as Fátima Chico
 Rocío García as Marisa Lezama
 Ulises de la Torre as Goyo Mejorada
 Edith González as Katy

References 

Mexican telenovelas
2017 Mexican television series debuts
2018 Mexican television series endings
TV Azteca telenovelas
Azteca Uno original programming
2017 telenovelas
Spanish-language telenovelas